A Shan is a village in the Plover Cove area of Tai Po District, New Territories, Hong Kong.

Administration
Tseng Tau, including A Shan and Tung Tsz, is a recognised village under the New Territories Small House Policy.

References

External links
 Delineation of area of existing village A Shan (Tai Po) for election of resident representative (2019 to 2022)

Villages in Tai Po District, Hong Kong